The Ratzeburg Rowing Club was founded in 1953 and is located in the town of Ratzeburg, Germany.  Karl Adam was one of its founders and was head of the Rowing Academy there.

Between 1959 and 1968, the Ratzeburg Club won seven titles at World and European Championships.  In addition the eight won a gold medal at the 1960 Summer Olympics in Rome, a silver medal at the 1964 Summer Olympics in Tokyo, and a gold medal at the 1968 Summer Olympics in Mexico.

Thomas Lange was a member of the club when he won his third Olympic medal in 1996 in the single scull. He had also won  medals representing East Germany prior to the German reunification. He continues to row for the club.

Honours

Henley Royal Regatta

References

External links

Sports clubs established in 1953
Rowing clubs in Germany
Ratzeburg